The United Nations General Committee is a committee of the United Nations General Assembly whose main purpose is to organize the body's agenda, among other things.

Mandate 
The Mandate of the General Committee consists of the following:

 Creating a provisional agenda for the  General Assembly, as well as any supplementary lists,
 Assisting the President of the General Assembly and the General Assembly in drawing up the agenda for each plenary meeting, 
 Making recommendations to the General Assembly concerning the recess and closing dates of the session, 
 Coordinating the proceedings of the main committees by allocating agenda items, as well as determining priority of said items, 
 Entertaining requests for the inclusion of additional items in the agenda,
 Assisting in the general conduct of the work of the General Assembly,
 Making recommendations to the General Assembly.

The Committee meets periodically to review the progress of the General Assembly and its committees. It also meets at such times as the President deems necessary or upon the request of any other of its members.

Members 
The composition of the Committee for the 76th Session of the General Assembly is as follows: the President of the United Nations General Assembly, the 21 Vice-Presidents of the Assembly and the chairs of the six main committees. The current members are as follow:

President of the General Assembly

Vice-Presidents

Chairpersons of the Six Main Committees

References 

United Nations General Assembly subsidiary organs
Committees